"Real You" is Yu Yamada's solo debut single. It was released on September 20, 2006 and was used as theme song for the movie Akihabara@Deep (starring Yu herself). The single peaked at number 10 on the  Oricon Charts, selling 10,886 copies on its first week.

Track listing
Real You
Do It
Real You (Army Slick's scratch build vocal)
Real You (Instrumental)
Do It (Instrumental)

2006 singles
Yu Yamada songs